Elsie Holloway (1882–1971) was a Canadian photographer known for her portraits, and historic photographs of Newfoundland people and environs.

Biography
Elsie Holloway was born in St. John's in 1882. She was the daughter of Henrietta Palfrey and Robert E. Holloway. Robert was a landscape photographer who introduced his two children, Bert and Elsie, to the process.

In the early 1900s Elsie and Bert established the Holloway Studio of St. John's, which was the first portrait studio in Newfoundland. Bert specialized in landscapes and Elsie specialized in portraits.

In 1915 Bert enlisted in the service and died in 1917 at the World War I battle of Monchy-le-Preux.

Elsie, meanwhile had been creating portraits of the Newfoundland Regiment enlistees in St. John's.

After the war Holloway kept the studio open, continuing to create portraits and landscape photographs. Notably, she photographed Amelia Earhart's 1932 flight from Harbour Grace, where Earhart began her solo transatlantic flight.

In 1946 Holloway retired and sold her studio.

Holloway died in 1971 in St. John's. Many of Holloway's glass negatives were stripped of their emulsion and used to build a greenhouse.

References

Further information
With the Camera: The Life of Elsie Holloway Newfoundland and Labrador Heritage video

1882 births
1971 deaths
20th-century photographers
20th-century Canadian women artists
20th-century Canadian artists
Canadian women photographers
Artists from Newfoundland and Labrador
People from St. John's, Newfoundland and Labrador
People from the Dominion of Newfoundland
20th-century women photographers